The Ardennes Weekend was an overall points classification based on the results of two Belgian classic cycling races: La Flèche Wallonne and Liège-Bastogne-Liège. 

It was created in 1950, and included, only that year, a third race, Liège-Courcelles. This classification first existed until 1964. It disappeared when the Flèche Wallonne became independent: from 1965 onwards, it was no longer held on the same weekend as Liège-Bastogne-Liège, but three days before.

In 1993, Amaury Sport Organisation bought La Flèche Wallonne, three years after acquiring Liège-Bastogne-Liège. Consequently, the Ardennes Weekend was recreated, from 1993 to 1997.

Jan Storms and Rolf Wolfshohl won the Ardennes weekend while they have never won either the Flèche Wallonne or Liège-Bastogne-Liège.

Palmares

References 

La Flèche Wallonne
Liège–Bastogne–Liège
Classic cycle races